Anne Cabot Wyman (1929–2014) was the Boston Globe's first full-time travel writer and was the first woman appointed editor of the Globe's editorial section. She received an AB from Radcliffe College in 1953.  She worked at Houghton Mifflin. In 1959, she joined the Boston Globe, where she worked for 31 years.  In 1975, she became the first woman appointed chief editor of the Globe's editorial pages.

References 

1929 births
2014 deaths
Radcliffe College alumni